Armando Fizzarotti (February 16, 1892 – February 15, 1966) was an Italian screenwriter and film director. Fizzarotti was a native of Naples, and his films are generally set in the city. He was specifically hired to direct Malaspina (1947) because of his experience making Neapolitan-style films. The film helped revive Neapolitan cinema, which had been suppressed during the Fascist era as production was centralised in Rome.

His son Ettore Maria Fizzarotti was also a film director.

Selected filmography

Director
 New Moon (1925)
 Naples in Green and Blue (1935)
 Malaspina (1947)
 Red Moon (1951)
 Naples Is Always Naples (1954)

Screenwriter
 The Lovers of Ravello (1951)

References

Bibliography 
 Marlow-Mann, Alex. The New Neapolitan Cinema. Edinburgh University Press, 2011.

External links 
 

1892 births
1966 deaths
20th-century Italian screenwriters
Italian film directors
19th-century Neapolitan people
Italian male screenwriters
20th-century Italian male writers